The 2009 IIHF Inline Hockey World Championship was the 13th  IIHF Inline Hockey World Championship, an international inline hockey tournament run by the International Ice Hockey Federation. The World Championship runs alongside the 2009 IIHF Inline Hockey World Championship Division I tournament and took place between 6 and 13 June 2009 in Ingolstadt, Germany and the Saturn Arena. The tournament was won by Sweden, earning their third straight World Championship title and fifth overall. The United States finished in second place and Germany in third after defeating Finland in the bronze medal match. Slovakia, after losing the seventh/eighth game against Canada was relegated to Division I for 2010.

Venue

Qualification
Seven of the eight teams automatically qualified for the 2009 IIHF Inline Hockey World Championship while the eighth spot was awarded to the winner of the 2008 IIHF Inline Hockey World Championship Division I tournament. Six nations from Europe, and two nations from North America were represented. The 2008 Division I tournament was won by Canada who defeated Great Britain to earn promotion to the World Championship.

 − Winner of 2008 IIHF Inline Hockey World Championship Division I
 − Finished fifth in the 2008 World Championship
 − Finished sixth in the 2008 World Championship
 − Finished third in the 2008 World Championship
 − Finished second in the 2008 World Championship
 − Finished seventh in the 2008 World Championship
 − Finished first in the 2008 World Championship
 − Finished fourth in the 2008 World Championship

Seeding and groups
The seeding in the preliminary round was based on the final standings at the 2008 IIHF Inline Hockey World Championship and 2008 IIHF Inline Hockey World Championship Division I tournaments. The World Championship groups are named Group A and Group B while the 2009 IIHF Inline Hockey World Championship Division I tournament uses Group C and Group D, as both tournaments were held in Ingolstadt, Germany. The teams were grouped accordingly by seeding at the previous year's tournament (in parenthesis is the corresponding seeding):

Group A
 (1)
 (4)
 (5)
 (8)

Group B
 (2)
 (3)
 (6)
 (7)

Preliminary round
Eight participating teams were placed in the following two groups. After playing a round-robin, the top three teams in each group advance to the playoff round. The last team in each group compete in the qualifying round where they face-off against the top ranked teams of Group C and Group D from the Division I tournament for a chance to participate in the Top Division playoffs.

All times are local (UTC+2).

Group A

Group B

Qualifying round
Canada and Slovakia advanced to the qualifying round after finishing last in Group A and Group B respectively. Canada faced off against Austria, who finished first in Group C of the Division I tournament, and Slovakia was drawn against Brazil, who finished first in Group D of the Division I tournament, for a chance to participate in the Top Division playoffs. Both Canada and Slovakia won their matches and advanced to the Top Division playoffs, while Austria and Brazil advanced to the Division I playoffs.

All times are local (UTC+2).

Playoff round
Canada and Slovakia advanced to the playoff round after winning their qualifying round matches. They were seeded alongside the six other teams of the tournament based on their results in the preliminary round. The four winning quarterfinalists advanced to the semifinals while the losing teams moved on to the placement round. Slovakia was relegated to Division I after losing the seventh/8th game against Canada, while Slovenia finished fifth after defeating the Czech Republic in the fifth/6th game. In the semifinals the United States defeated Finland and Sweden beat Germany, both advancing to the gold medal game. After losing the semifinals Finland and Germany played off for the bronze medal with Germany winning 9–5. Sweden defeated the United States 7–6 in the gold medal game, earning their third straight World Championship title and fifth overall.

Draw

All times are local (UTC+2).

Quarter-finals

Placement round

5th/6th game

7th/8th game

Semi-finals

Bronze medal game

Gold medal game

Ranking and statistics

Tournament Awards
Best players selected by the directorate:
Best Goalkeeper:  Dennis Karlsson
Best Defenseman:  Ernie Hartlieb
Best Forward:  Thomas Greilinger

Final standings
The final standings of the tournament according to IIHF:

Scoring leaders

List shows the top skaters sorted by points, then goals. If the list exceeds 10 skaters because of a tie in points, all of the tied skaters are shown. Games from the qualifying round do not count towards the statistics.

Leading goaltenders

Only the top five goaltenders, based on save percentage, who have played 40% of their team's minutes are included in this list. Games from the qualifying round do not count towards the statistics.

References

External links
World Championship at IIHF.com

2009 in German sport
Iihf Inline Hockey World Championship, 2009
IIHF InLine Hockey World Championship
Inline hockey in Germany
I
June 2009 sports events in Europe
Sports competitions in Ingolstadt